Dakar Region is the smallest and most populated Region of Senegal, encompassing the capital city of the country, Dakar, and all its suburbs along the Cap–Vert Peninsula, Africa's most westerly point.

Administration
The Dakar region is divided into five départements (administrative structures without political power, unlike the French départements). The départements had the following areas and populations at the Census of 2013:

Keur Massar Department was formed in May 2021.

Dakar department
Dakar Department is also a commune (city). This is a situation comparable to Paris which is both a department and a commune. The department/commune of Dakar is further divided into:
4 arrondissements, which are administrative structures without much power. The arrondissements are further divided into:
19 communes d'arrondissement (i.e. "communes of arrondissement"). The communes d'arrondissement have a lot of power, unlike the arrondissements of Paris, and are more comparable to the London boroughs.

Guédiawaye department
Guédiawaye Department is also a commune (city). This department has only one arrondissement, so that Guédiawaye is both a department and an arrondissement. The department /arrondissement/commune of Guédiawaye is further divided into:
5 communes d'arrondissement

Pikine department
Pikine Department is also a commune (city). The department /commune of Pikine is further divided into:
3 arrondissements, which are further divided into:
16 communes d'arrondissement

Rufisque department
Rufisque Department is made up of two arrondissements and six urban communes:
Rufisque arrondissement, which is also a commune (city). The arrondissement/commune of Rufisque is divided into 3 communes d'arrondissement:
 Rufisque Centre (Nord)
 Rufisque Est
 Rufisque Ouest
Bambylor arrondissement, which, administratively speaking, is the only rural part of the Dakar region. The Bambylor arrondissement is divided into 3 communautés rurales (i.e. "rural communities"):
 Yène
 Bambylor
 Tivaouane Peulh-Niaga
 The six communes of Bargny, Sébikotane,  Diamniadio, Jaxaay-Parcelle-Niakoul Rap, Sangalkam and Sendou

Table of Administrative Sub-divisions

Conclusion
Within the Dakar 'region, the only politically significant units (i.e. those who have elected officials and wield a significant power) are: the 7 communes, the 2 communautés rurales, and the 43 communes d'arrondissement.

References

External links
Regional Council of Dakar official website 
Collectivités locales de Dakar from Republic of Senegal Government site, l'Agence de l'informatique de l'État (ADIE). 
Décret fixant le ressort territorial et le chef lieu des régions et des départements , décret n°2002-166 du 21 février 2002.
Code des collectivités locales , Loi n° 96-06 du 22 mars 1996.

 
Regions of Senegal